The Venezuela women's national under-16 and under-17 basketball team is a national basketball team of Venezuela, administered by the Federación Venezolana de Baloncesto.

It represents the country in international under-16 and under-17 (under age 16 and under age 17) women's basketball competitions.

See also
Venezuela women's national basketball team
Venezuela women's national under-19 basketball team
Venezuela men's national under-17 basketball team

References

External links
Venezuela Basketball Records at FIBA Archive

B
Women's national under-17 basketball teams